Irma is a village in central Alberta, Canada.

History 
The Village of Irma came into being in 1908 when the Grand Trunk Pacific Railway came through. Irma was later incorporated as a Village on May 30, 1912. The village was supposedly named after the daughter of the GTPR second vice-president General William Wainwright. Records show three major fires in the downtown area. These broke out in 1911, 1931 and 1963. Most of the buildings on the main street (now 50 Street) were reconstructed after the 1931 fire.  Alberta's first rural high school was located in Irma; it was eventually replaced and the new school opened on November 4, 2019.

Demographics 

In the 2016 Census of Population conducted by Statistics Canada, the Village of Irma recorded a population of 521 living in 221 of its 242 total private dwellings, a  change from its 2011 population of 457.

Notable people 
Jean Paré – cookbook author and publisher
Gord Mark - NHL player, drafted by New Jersey Devils, round 6 #105 overall, 1983 NHL Entry Draft. Played with Devils (1986-1988) and Edmonton Oilers (1993-1995)
Carson Soucy - NHL player, drafted by Minnesota Wild, round 5 #137 overall, 2013 NHL Entry Draft. Played with Wild (2017-2018)
Parker MacKay - University of Minnesota-Duluth (2015-2019), captain for 2018-2019

See also 
List of communities in Alberta
List of villages in Alberta

References

External links 

1912 establishments in Alberta
Villages in Alberta